What If? is the fourth studio album by Canadian country music band Emerson Drive. It was released in 2004 as their final release for DreamWorks Records Nashville. "Last One Standing" and "November" were both released in the U.S. as singles, peaking at #21 and #41, respectively, on the Billboard country charts. "If You Were My Girl" and "Still Got Yesterday" were released in Canada only. Also included on this album is a cover of the Nitty Gritty Dirt Band's Number One hit "Fishin' in the Dark".

The tracks "You're Like Coming Home" and "I'll Die Tryin'" were both recorded by the country music band Lonestar on their 2005 album Coming Home, from which both were released as singles.

Track listing

Personnel
Patrick Bourque – bass guitar 
Danick Dupelle – lead guitar, background vocals
Brad Mates – lead vocals, acoustic guitar
Mike Melancon – drums, percussion
David Pichette – fiddle
Dale Wallace - keyboards

All instruments performed by Emerson Drive, except: Paul Franklin (steel guitar on "I'll Die Tryin'") and Cliff Colnot (strings).

Chart performance

References

2004 albums
Albums produced by Richard Marx
Emerson Drive albums
DreamWorks Records albums